Ghar Ki Izzat may refer to:

 Ghar Ki Izzat (1948 film), a 1948 Hindi social family drama film 
 Ghar Ki Izzat (1994 film), a 1994 Bollywood drama film